Anarchism in Canada spans a range of anarchist philosophy including anarchist communism, green anarchy, anarcho-syndicalism, individualist anarchism, as well as other lesser known forms. Canadian anarchism has been affected by thought from Great Britain, and continental Europe, although recent influences include a look at North American indigenism, especially on the West Coast. Anarchists remain a focal point in media coverage of globalization protests in Canada, mainly due to their confrontations with police and destruction of property.

History 

Historically, anarchism has never attracted large support in Canada, although small groups of activists and writers have often existed in many areas, especially in the larger cities. As well, self-organization played an important part in village life during the settling of the West (Saskatchewan, specifically) as the State was distant and infrastructure-related matters such as maintaining roads, building bridges and schools, and organizing local governance and social life needed to be tackled through spontaneous self-organization. Peter Kropotkin also arranged for Doukhobors (a sect of Russian Christians who refuse to acknowledge State authority) to settle in Saskatchewan and later B.C.

The Media Collective was a social group based in Toronto between 1994 and 1996 whose events included guerrilla performances and free vegan meals from Food Not Bombs. One of its splinter groups, TAO Communications ("The Anarchy Organization"),  opposed transnational neoliberalism and Silicon Valley views of capitalism by providing unionized communications service: both communication logistics during actions and reports on police.

Projects
There are a variety of long-standing anarchist projects throughout Canada. Environmental and anti-poverty direct actionists can be found in many regions and cities, along with mutual aid groups, prisoner solidarity groups, study groups, and cafes.

Related ventures include Montreal's Insoumise bookstore, which in 2004 supplanted the Alternative bookshop, an anarchist bookshop founded in the early 1970s; Ottawa's Exile Infoshop, founded early 2007; as well as numerous other bookstores, infoshops, publishing houses, zines and other publications, record labels, and radio shows and micro radio stations. Canada is also home to a number of anarchist book fairs and other festivals. In 2015, the Victoria Anarchist Book Fair celebrated its 10th anniversary. Edmonton held an anarchist book fair from 2002 through 2013, inclusive; it was resurrected in May 2015. Similar fairs are held in Montréal, Toronto, Winnipeg, and other locations throughout Canada.

See also

 Camas Bookstore and Infoshop
 G7 Welcoming Committee
 List of anarchist organizations
 Mondragon Bookstore
 Ontario Coalition Against Poverty
 Political culture of Canada
 Socialism in Canada
 Squamish Five

References

Further reading 

 

 
Canada
Political movements in Canada